"Circuit no Musume" (サーキットの娘, also known by its alternative title "Wild Girls on Circuit") is the third single released by Japanese pop duo Puffy AmiYumi on March 12, 1997. The single was one of few releases to gain a #1 hit, with singles "Kore ga Watashi no Ikirumichi", "Nagisa ni Matsuwaru Et Cetera", and album Jet-CD. The single's cover design, when put alongside the right side of the cover from the single "Nagisa ni Matsuwaru Et Cetera", create a single picture together.

Track listing
Circuit no Musume
Circuit no Musume (Original Karaoke)

References

Puffy AmiYumi songs
1997 singles
1997 songs